State Route 94 (SR 94) is a primary state highway in the U.S. state of Virginia.  Known for much of its length as Ivanhoe Road, the state highway runs  from U.S. Route 58 (US 58) and US 221 near Galax north to US 52 in Fort Chiswell.  SR 94 connects Galax, Wytheville, and Independence (via SR 274) with the communities of Fries and Ivanhoe along the New River, which the highway parallels for much of its length.

Route description

SR 94 begins at an intersection with US 58 and US 221 (Grayson Parkway) in Grayson County west of Galax.  The state highway heads northwest as Riverside Drive, which crosses the New River and parallels the river upstream to the highway's intersection with SR 274 (Riverside Drive).  At that intersection, SR 94 turns north onto Scenic Road, which heads toward the town of Fries.  The state highway parallels the New River, this time following it downstream, into the town limits to the west end of Main Street, where SR 94 makes a sharp turn northwest onto Ivanhoe Road.  The state highway ascents out of the narrow river valley and enters Carroll County.  SR 94 has a winding path that crosses Brush Creek and Little Brush Creek and passes to the west of Cold Ridge.  The state highway straightens and approaches the New River again as it enters Wythe County, then curves northwest and passes through the village of Ivanhoe.  SR 94 heads north out of Ivanhoe, crosses Cripple Creek, and runs straight between intersections with its old alignment, named Virginia 94 Old or Sheffey School Road.  The state highway reaches its northern terminus at the east end of Lick Mountain at an intersection with US 52 (Fort Chiswell Road) in Fort Chiswell.

Major intersections

References

External links

Virginia Highways Project: VA 94

094
State Route 094
State Route 094
State Route 094
1933 establishments in Virginia